Southern Naga (formerly also Northwestern Kuki-Chin or Old Kuki) is a branch of Kuki-Chin-Naga languages.

Languages
Scott DeLancey, et al. (2015) classify the following languages as Southern Naga (i.e., Northwestern Kuki-Chin). Purum and Kharam have been added from Peterson (2017).

Aimol
Anal
Chiru
Chothe
Kharam
Koren
Kom
Lamkang
Monsang
Moyon
Purum
Tarao

References

DeLancey, Scott; Krishna Boro; Linda Konnerth; Amos Teo. 2015. Tibeto-Burman Languages of the Indo-Myanmar borderland. 31st South Asian Languages Analysis Roundtable, 14 May 2015.
Peterson, David. 2017. "On Kuki-Chin subgrouping." In Picus Sizhi Ding and Jamin Pelkey, eds. Sociohistorical linguistics in Southeast Asia: New horizons for Tibeto-Burman studies in honor of David Bradley, 189-209. Leiden: Brill.
VanBik, Kenneth. 2009. Proto-Kuki-Chin: A Reconstructed Ancestor of the Kuki-Chin Languages. STEDT Monograph 8. .